Uladzislau Kulesh (born 28 May 1996) is a Belarusian handball player for TSV Hannover-Burgdorf and the Belarusian national team.

He competed at the 2016 European Men's Handball Championship.

References

External links

1996 births
Living people
Sportspeople from Gomel
Belarusian male handball players
Expatriate handball players in Poland
Belarusian expatriate sportspeople in Poland
Vive Kielce players